Jason Michael Cauchi (born July 11, 1979), known professionally as Jax Taylor, is an American television personality, model, and actor. He was previously featured on the Bravo reality television series Vanderpump Rules. until allegedly being fired in December 2020.

Early life and education 
Taylor was born in Shelby Township, Michigan on July 11, 1979, to Marie and Ronald Cauchi. His mother is an Australian, and his father is Maltese. He has a sister, Jenny Lynn. He was raised Catholic and attended church until he was 19 years old.  In 1998, he graduated from Eisenhower High School in Shelby Township, Michigan. He attended Michigan State University and community college, but he dropped out of school to enter the Navy. He was in the Navy for 6 months, 4 days and was trained at a base in Norfolk, Virginia.

Career 
From 2002 to 2010, Taylor worked as a model in Europe and lived in Miami in an apartment with four other male models, including Channing Tatum. Taylor signed with Ford Models in New York City. He has appeared on several magazine editorials and front covers, including Trump Magazine, V Man, GQ Japan, Men’s Health,  Cosmopolitan, 944 Magazine, Esquire, Instinct, CosmoGirl and Out. He has also starred in campaigns for Target, Macy's, JCPenney, Old Navy, Nordstrom, Kohl's, Sketchers, Paul Mitchell, AussieBum, 2(x)ist, Taco Bell and Abercrombie & Fitch. In 2018, he resumed his modelling career by starring in a Jack Victor campaign.

He started working at Lisa Vanderpump's restaurants SUR and Villa Blanca, which earned him a spot on the reality television series Vanderpump Rules in 2013, following the lives of the SUR and Villa Blanca servers. Taylor and Brittany Cartwright got their own spin-off television series Vanderpump Rules: Jax and Brittany Take Kentucky, which followed the couple's visit to Cartwright's hometown in Kentucky. In 2014, Taylor collaborated with XCALIBUR BRAND to create a shoe and sweater collection titled Jax Taylor by XCALIBUR BRAND. In 2014, Taylor also created a fitness application.

Personal life 
He began dating Brittany Cartwright in 2015. The couple got engaged in Malibu, California on June 7, 2018. The couple wed on June 29, 2019, in Kentucky. In September 2020, the couple announced were expecting their first child due in April 2021. They had a boy named Cruz Michael Cauchi on April 12, 2021.

Filmography

References

External links

1979 births
Living people
American actors
21st-century American male actors
American television personalities
Male models from Michigan